Three-Cornered Hat may refer to:

The Three-Cornered Hat, 1919 Spanish ballet
The Three-Cornered Hat (film), 1935 Italian comedy film
Tricorne, a three-cornered hat popular during the 18th century